Orchid Enclave is a pair of  residential skyscrapers in Mumbai, Maharastra, India.The total floor count is 55 floors, with five floors for parking. The construction of the building was completed by Khan Group in February 2017.

Features
The complex  have  of podium garden. There are five levels of car parking capable of holding 1000 cars at a time.

See also
 List of tallest buildings in Mumbai
 List of tallest buildings in India
 List of tallest buildings and structures in the Indian subcontinent

References

Buildings and structures in Mumbai
Residential skyscrapers in Mumbai